Two22 is a 41-floor tower located on 9th Street and 3rd Avenue in Minneapolis, Minnesota. It is the fifth tallest building in Minneapolis. 

The building was originally named after Piper Jaffray, which subsequently rebranded to Piper Sandler Companies, which used the building as its headquarters when the building opened in 1985.  In 2000, after Piper Jaffray was acquired by U.S. Bancorp and moved its headquarters to U.S. Bancorp Center, the building was renamed Campbell Mithun Tower, referencing an advertising and marketing firm that was headquartered in the building that later rebranded itself to Mithun Agency in 2014 and dissolved in 2016. In 2019, the Campbell Mithun Tower changed ownership and was renamed "Two22," styled after the building's street address.

Building amenities include conference facilities, a fitness center, bike storage, underground parking, and on-site management.

Two22 earned Gold-level certification through the Leadership in Energy & Environmental Design (LEED) program, which was developed by the United States Green Building Council (USGBC). The tower was first certified in 2009 then again in 2014.

Broadcasting

Television

See also
List of tallest buildings in Minnesota

References

External links 

 Official Website

Skyscraper office buildings in Minneapolis
Office buildings completed in 1985